Pupillin is a commune in the Jura department in Bourgogne-Franche-Comté in eastern France.

Population

Geography 
Pupillin is located in the hills above Arbois, and is famed locally for its extensive vineyards, where monks were already growing grapes 1,000 years ago. Its marl soils and steep slopes provide excellent growing conditions for the local Poulsard and Savagnin grape varieties, the latter of which produces the renowned local Vin Jaune or Yellow Wine. The village even boasts the title of Capital of Ploussard, adopting the spelling of the grape variety which is particular to this village.

Pupillin is an authorised, special mention on bottles of APO Arbois wine.

See also
Communes of the Jura department

References

Communes of Jura (department)